Michael James Oakley (born 3 January 1982) is a Scottish synthwave producer and musician.

Early life
Oakley was born in Glasgow but moved to Los Angeles in 2016, before settling in Canada in 2018. He attended Williamwood High School in Clarkston, East Renfrewshire. He is a self-taught musician, having taken piano lessons for a short period in his youth.

Career
Having worked in Glasgow's cover band scene for some years, Oakley penned what would become his debut album, California, in 2016. Lesley Daunt of The Huffington Post wrote in 2017 of the lead single "Turn Back Time", "Oakley's captivating beats and celestial synthesizers have given a fresh approach and revival to classic pop".

In 2017, Oakley released California to critical acclaim from The Huffington Post and popular YouTube channel and record label NewRetroWave.

In 2019, the artist released his sophomore album, Introspect, which was listed in NewRetroWave's Top 10 albums list of 2019.

In 2020, Oakley issued the track "Wake Up!", featuring Ollie Wride, as part of the soundtrack to the game Wave Break: High Tide, through Funktronic Labs. In the same year, he contributed an instrumental remix of his 2016 single "Rabbit in the Headlights" to the soundtrack of the mobile game Retro Drive.

On 16 April 2021, Oakley announced the release of a new single, "Is There Anybody Out There", co-written by fellow labelmate Ollie Wride and produced by Jon Campbell of The Time Frequency.

Oakley released his third studio album, Odyssey, on 14 May 2021, through NewRetroWave Records. Callum Crumlish of Daily Express wrote, "The glowing eight-track record oozes style and electronica while managing to steer clear of the cliched building blocks of the genre".

Life-saving incident
In 2012, while returning from a performance at a wedding function near Glasgow, Oakley rescued two men from a burning car.

Discography

Albums
 California (2017)
 Introspect (2019)
 Odyssey (2021)

EPs
 Four (2022)

Singles
 "Turn Back Time" (2016)
 "Rabbit in the Headlights" (2016)
 "Afterglow" - Scandroid (Michael Oakley Remix) (2018)
 "Control" (2018)
 "Now I'm Alive" (feat. Dana Jean Phoenix) (2019)
 "Euphoria" - Scandroid (Michael Oakley Remix) (2019)
 "Queen of Hearts" (2020)
 "Wake Up!" - feat. Ollie Wride (Wave Break: High Tide Soundtrack) (2020)
 "Is There Anybody Out There" (2021)
 "Glasgow Song"  (feat. Dana Jean Phoenix) (2021)

References

External links
 
 
 

Living people
1982 births
People educated at Williamwood High School
Synthwave musicians
21st-century Scottish male musicians